George Thynne, 2nd Baron Carteret PC (23 January 1770 – 19 February 1838), styled Lord George Thynne between 1789 and 1826, was a British Tory politician.

Background and education
Carteret was the second son of Thomas Thynne, 1st Marquess of Bath by his wife  Lady Elizabeth Bentinck, a daughter of William Bentinck, 2nd Duke of Portland. In 1784 his uncle Henry Carteret, 1st Baron Carteret (born Henry Thynne) was created Baron Carteret (the second creation of that title, previously held by his own childless maternal uncle Robert Carteret, 3rd Earl Granville (1721–1776)) with special remainder to the younger sons of his elder brother, the 1st Marquess of Bath. He was educated at St John's College, Cambridge.

Political career
Carteret was elected Member of Parliament for Weobly in 1790, a seat he held until 1812, and served as a Lord of the Treasury from 1801 to 1804. In 1804 he was admitted to the Privy Council and appointed Comptroller of the Household, a post he held until 1812. In 1826 he succeeded his uncle as second Baron Carteret according to the special remainder and took his seat in the House of Lords.

Marriage
In 1797 Lord Carteret married the Hon. Harriet Courtenay (1772–1836), daughter of William Courtenay, 2nd Viscount Courtenay. They had no children. She died in April 1836, aged 64.

Death and succession
Lord Carteret survived his wife by two years and died at Dalkeith Palace, Midlothian, in February 1838, aged 68. He was succeeded in the barony by his younger brother, John Thynne, 3rd Baron Carteret.

References

1770 births
1838 deaths
Alumni of St John's College, Cambridge
Thynne, George
Members of the Parliament of Great Britain for English constituencies
British MPs 1790–1796
British MPs 1796–1800
Members of the Parliament of the United Kingdom for English constituencies
George
UK MPs 1801–1802
UK MPs 1802–1806
UK MPs 1806–1807
UK MPs 1807–1812
UK MPs who inherited peerages
2